Kashefi or Kashifi may refer to:

 Husayn Kashifi (1436-1504), 15th century Persian prose-stylist and Islamic scholar
 Kashifi (Ottoman poet), 15th century Ottoman poet 
 Ken Jebsen (born 1966, as Moustafa Kashefi), German journalist 
 Seyed Ali Kashefi Khansari (born 1972), Iranian poet
 Elham Kashefi, 21st century Iranian academic